Giardinello (Sicilian: Jardineddu) is a comune (municipality) in the Metropolitan City of Palermo in the Italian region Sicily, located about  west of Palermo.

Giardinello borders the following municipalities: Borgetto, Carini, Monreale, Montelepre, Partinico.

History
The town rose as a feudal village in the early 1700s at the foot of San Martino mountains and was populated by inhabitants of the nearby town of Partinico.

On December 10, 1893, eleven people were killed in the Giardinello massacre during the Fasci Siciliani uprising after a rally that asked for the abolition of taxes on food and disbandment of the local field guards. The protestors carried the portrait of the King taken from the municipality and burned tax files.

Demographic evolution

References

External links
  Official website

Municipalities of the Metropolitan City of Palermo